The final of the Men's 200 metres Freestyle event at the European LC Championships 1997 was held on Tuesday 19 August 1997 in Seville, Spain.

Finals

Qualifying heats

Remarks

See also
1996 Men's Olympic Games 200m Freestyle
1997 Men's World Championships (SC) 200m Freestyle

References
 scmsom results
 La Gazzetta Archivio
 swimrankings

F